DISK Theatre (abbreviation: Theatre State Conservatory) is a theater located in Prague, Czech Republic. It constitutes part of the Theatre Faculty of the Academy of Performing Arts in Prague. Performers are students of the Department of Dramatic Theatre (KCD) and of the Department of Alternative and Puppet Theatre.

History
 The theater was founded in 1945 as part of the State Conservatory. Until 1999, the theater used the Celetná Theatre for its work. In February 1999, the conservatory moved into the new atrium of the Academy of Performing Arts, designed by architects Karel Hubacek and George Hakulína. Inauguration took place in February 1999. The new space has a capacity of about 130 seats.

References

Culture in Prague
Theatres in Prague
Music venues in Prague
Theatres completed in 1945
1945 establishments in Czechoslovakia
20th-century architecture in the Czech Republic